Malcolm Colin Cameron  (April 12, 1831 – September 26, 1898) was a businessman and lawyer in Ontario, Canada. He represented Huron South in the House of Commons of Canada from 1867 to 1875 and from 1878 to 1882 and Huron West from 1882 to 1887, 1891 to 1892 and 1896 to 1898.

He was born in Perth in Upper Canada in 1831. He was the probably adopted son of Malcolm Cameron. He attended Knox College in Toronto, later studying law. In 1855, he had moved to Goderich, was called to the bar in 1860, later became part of a law firm there and was appointed Queen's Counsel in 1876. Cameron joined the Goderich town council and later became mayor. In 1867, he was elected to the 1st Canadian Parliament representing Huron South.

His re-election in 1874 was overturned in 1875 but he was elected again in 1878. He defended the interests of the salt industry in the Goderich area in parliament. He took an interest in western Canada, pushing without success for representation in parliament for the North-West Territories and denouncing the hanging of Louis Riel.

In June 1898, he was appointed Lieutenant Governor of the North-West Territories.

He died a few months later in London, Ontario.

His son Malcolm also served as a member of the Ontario assembly and as mayor of Goderich.

Euphemia township in Lambton County, Ontario was named by Cameron in honour of his mother, Euphemia McGregor.

References 
Notes

Sources

External links

 

1831 births
1898 deaths
Members of the House of Commons of Canada from Ontario
Liberal Party of Canada MPs
Canadian people of British descent
Canadian King's Counsel